Martin Luther School is a co-educational private Lutheran middle and high school in the Maspeth neighborhood of the borough of Queens, New York City, in the State of New York, United States. Founded in 1960 as Martin Luther High School, the name of the school was changed to Martin Luther School in 2012 when a middle school was added.

Students
Martin Luther School serves students from Queens and Brooklyn from a variety of ethnic, religious, and academic backgrounds.

Academics
Students are required to take classes in business, English, history, fine arts, foreign languages, mathematics, physical education, science, and theology. Martin Luther also offers Advanced Placement courses.

Martin Luther School is accredited by the Middle States Association Commissions on Elementary and Secondary Schools.

Extracurricular
Martin Luther School offers several extracurricular activities. The school mascot is the Black Cougar, and the athletics department offers baseball, basketball, cross country, soccer, softball, tennis, track and field, girls volleyball, and wrestling.

Band, chorus, and choir are offered for academic credit. The Drama Club (Troupe #980) is a member of the International Thespian Society. Students interested in spiritual growth or community service can join the Beatitudes or the Key Club. The school has a semi-monthly student-run newspaper, The Cougar Chronicle, and a yearbook, Invictus. The school has a chapter of the National Honor Society.

References

External links

Lutheran schools in New York (state)
Private high schools in Queens, New York
Private middle schools in Queens, New York
Maspeth, Queens
Secondary schools affiliated with the Lutheran Church–Missouri Synod